German submarine U-710 was a Type VIIC U-boat of Nazi Germany's Kriegsmarine during World War II. She had an extremely short career, only conducting one patrol in April 1943 and attacking no ships. Just nine days after starting her first patrol, she was sunk by a B-17 Flying Fortress with the loss of all hands.

Design
German Type VIIC submarines were slight modifications of their Type VIIB predecessors; the length and weight were slightly larger and an active sonar was added. U-710 had a displacement of  when at the surface and  while submerged. She had two shafts and two  propellers.

U-710 was fitted with five  torpedo tubes (four fitted at the bow and one at the stern), fourteen torpedoes, one  deck gun, 220 rounds, and two twin  anti-aircraft guns. The boat had a complement of between forty-four and sixty.

Service

Construction and training
U-710 was ordered on 15 August 1940 and laid down on 4 June 1941 at H. C. Stülcken Sohn, Hamburg, as yard number 774. The submarine was launched on 12 May 1942 and commissioned on 2 September 1942 under the command of Oberleutnant zur See Dietrich von Carlewitz. Upon commissioning, U-710 was attached to the 5th U-boat Flotilla for training.

First patrol and sinking
On 1 April 1943, U-710 completed training and was attached to the 7th U-boat Flotilla for active service. Fourteen days later, the submarine departed from Kiel on her first service patrol, sailing through the North Sea and into the North Atlantic Ocean.

On 24 April 1943, while the submarine was sailing in the North Atlantic south of Iceland, U-710 was spotted on the surface by a British B-17 Flying Fortress of No. 206 Squadron RAF, patrolling in support of convoy ONS 5. The bomber attacked through heavy anti-aircraft fire and dropped six shallow depth charges, which seemed to lift the boat out of the water'. The B-17 crew reported seeing some twenty-five German sailors swimming near the wreck of U-710, but all 49 hands were lost.

References

Bibliography

 
 
 

German Type VIIC submarines
U-boats commissioned in 1942
1942 ships
U-boats sunk in 1943
World War II submarines of Germany
Ships built in Hamburg
U-boats sunk by British aircraft
U-boats sunk by depth charges
World War II shipwrecks in the Atlantic Ocean
Ships lost with all hands
Maritime incidents in April 1943